kunanyi/Mount Wellington is a dominant feature on the skyline above Hobart, in Tasmania, Australia.

An aerial cableway (cable car) from Hobart to the peak of the mountain, has been proposed for the mountain on four occasions.

Early proposals 
The first two of these pre-dated the construction of Pinnacle Road.  In 1905, Arnold Wertheimer proposed the construction of an aerial cableway (at the time referred to as an "aerial railway") from The Springs to the Pinnacle of Mt Wellington, and in 1906 established The Mount Wellington Aerial Railway Company Ltd.  This proposal was soon modified to run from Cascades to the pinnacle, but in the end never eventuated.

The concept was shelved until 1931, when an Aerial Tramway proposal involving a nine-minute journey from The Springs to the pinnacle was publicised.  Included in this was a kiosk and observation deck, as well as the potential to provide for skiing on the slopes at the rear of the mountain.

After construction of Pinnacle Road was completed in 1937, momentum for an aerial cableway slowed.  While general access to the pinnacle was easily available, justification for later cableway developments included the inability to access the pinnacle on periods of high snowfall; the growth of Tasmania as a tourism destination; and, since the increase of climate change awareness in the later parts of the 20th century, the environmental impact of motor vehicle pollution.

1987 proposal 
The next proposal did not come forward until 1987, when the first of three proposals by Hobart engineer Tim Burbury was announced.  The 1987 proposal, by Burbury's company Trinity Projects, was to feature a hotel on the pinnacle serviced by a cable car based at Fern Tree.  The public opposition was high enough that the plan was dropped before it went into detailed design.   In 1993, Burbury relaunched a modified proposal, estimated to cost 31 million, known as Skyway.  It featured a change of base location, to a hill near Cascade Brewery, and used two high capacity carriages to transport passengers.  At the pinnacle, the hotel proposal was dumped for a restaurant, and added a ski field at the rear of the mountain.  Again, there was strong public opposition to this plan – including a reduction of privacy of residents near the lower part of the cable car, and destruction of the natural alpine environment.  The third revision of Burbury's plan was announced in 2004, including an alternate route, change from a large carriage to a series of smaller gondolas, a modified pinnacle centre design and removal of the ski field component of the project.

2014 proposal 

After Burbury's death in 2010, Hobart businessman and entrepreneur Adrian Bold took on a renewed focus to develop a cable car for Mt Wellington.  Several years of advocacy, feasibility assessment and preliminary design, culminated in a formal launch on 16 April 2014 of a two-part route from Cascade Brewery to a pinnacle centre at the summit, including a restaurant, café and function centre.  The proponent's partner, Toronto-based company BullWheel International, announced in November 2015, that it no longer had any involvement with the cable car proposal.

The issue continued to be in public discussion over the years.

2018 
The planning and construction of a cable car has been beset by a range of issues, Including environmental, Aboriginal cultural heritage and aesthetic concerns.

The cable car proposal remains a divisive issue  with opposition to the idea being led by a South Hobart based group.

On 10 August 2018 a Hobart City Council committee voted against allowing the allocation of public lands for the project and on 27 July 2021 the full council voted against the project.

The proposal's proponents plan lost an appeal, with Tasmania's planning authority ruling it failed to satisfy standards around noise, visual impact and biodiversity.

Notes

Mount Wellington (Tasmania)
Proposed transport infrastructure in Australia
Proposed aerial lifts